The Morris Marshal is a large six-cylinder vehicle which was produced by the British Motor Corporation (Australia) between 1957 and 1960. The car was a Morris branded version of the Austin Westminster which was marketed by BMC Australia's Austin dealers as the Austin A95 Westminster. Production totaled 1,341 sedans, 54 Traveller wagons and 30 panel vans.

References

Further reading
 Dennis Harrison, Morris Marshal 1957–1960, Restored Cars, No 91, March–April 1992, page 20

Marshal
Cars introduced in 1957
Cars of Australia